Joseph Peacock or Peacocke may refer to:

Joseph Peacock (architect) (1821–1893), British architect
Joseph Peacock (politician), South Australian politician and businessman
Joseph Peacocke (archbishop of Dublin) (1835–1916), Irish Anglican bishop
Joseph Peacocke (bishop of Derry and Raphoe) (1866–1962), Irish Anglican bishop; son of the above
Joseph Peacocke (cricketer) (1904–1961), Irish cricketer